Malaysia competed at the 2021 Summer Deaflympics at Caxias do Sul, Brazil from 1 to 15 May 2022.

Medalists

Athletics 

 Mohammad Faza Firdaus Ghazali 
 Muhammad Irshad Saizul 
 Muhammad Shahrul Azmer Azman  
 Nor Shahdan Mohamad
 Zaiman Megat Abu

Badminton 

 Edmund Teo Seng Keong 
 Muhamad Shafiq Hasan 
 Boon Wei Ying 
 Foo Zu Tung

Cycling 

 Ramly Ismail

Karate 

 Yilamaran Vispalinggam

References

External links 
 Malaysia at the Deaflympics

Malaysia at the Deaflympics
2022 in Malaysian sport
Nations at the 2021 Summer Deaflympics